Trần Liêm Điều (born 19 February 2001) is a Vietnamese footballer who plays as a goalkeeper for V.League 1 club Nam Định and the Vietnam national under-23 team.

International career

2022 AFF U-23 Championship
At the 2022 AFF U-23 Championship, before the semi-final match against the Timor-Leste, Vietnam had only 9 players eligible to compete, because the players The rest have all tested positive for COVID-19. Trần Liêm Điều is one of four players called up for the Vietnam U23 team.
On February 24, 2022, he was present in Cambodia to join the team just a few hours before the semi-finals of the tournament. In the extra time of the first extra time, he was substituted by coach Dinh The Nam for Nguyen Trung Thanh, this is the first time Liem Dieu has played in the Vietnam U23 in an official match. regional level. 
This player played 21 minutes in the role of a striker, helping Vietnam win against Timor-Leste to reach the final of the 2022 AFF U-23 Championship.

Honours
Vietnam U23
 AFF U-23 Championship: 2022

References

External links
 

2001 births
Living people
People from Nam Định province
Vietnamese footballers
Association football goalkeepers

Vietnam youth international footballers